Vasilii Belous (27 August 1988 – 31 August 2021) was a Moldovan boxer. At the 2012 Summer Olympics, he competed in the Men's welterweight, but was defeated in the second round.

References

External links
 

1988 births
2021 deaths
Moldovan male boxers
People from Ocnița District
Olympic boxers of Moldova
Boxers at the 2012 Summer Olympics
Welterweight boxers
European Games competitors for Moldova
Boxers at the 2015 European Games
Boxers at the 2019 European Games
Road incident deaths in Moldova